Savannah Airstrip (also known as Kihihi Airstrip)  is an airport serving Savannah Resort and the town of Kihihi, Uganda. The airstrip receives daily flights from Entebbe International Airport and Kajjansi Airfield, a route frequently used by tourists to visit the south of Queen Elizabeth National Park and north of Bwindi Impenetrable National Park.

Airlines and destinations

See also
Transport in Uganda
List of airports in Uganda

References

Airports in Uganda